The men's 4 × 400 metres relay event at the 2001 Summer Universiade was held at the Workers Stadium in Beijing, China between 30 August and 1 September.

Results

Heats

Final

References

Athletics at the 2001 Summer Universiade
2001